Lubomino  is a village in Lidzbark County, Warmian-Masurian Voivodeship, in northern Poland. It is the seat of the gmina (administrative district) called Gmina Lubomino.

References

Lubomino